Stephen Mark Agnew (born 9 November 1965) is an English football coach and former professional footballer, he is interim assistant manager of Scottish Premiership side Aberdeen.

As a player, he was a midfielder from 1983 to 2002, notably in the Premier League for Blackburn Rovers, Leicester City and Sunderland, and in the Football league for Barnsley, Portsmouth and York City before finishing his career in non-League with Gateshead.

He has since worked as a coach in a variety roles at Gateshead, Middlesbrough, Leeds United, Hartlepool Utd, Hull City, Aston Villa, Sheffield Wednesday, Newcastle United, West Bromwich Albion and Aberdeen.

Playing career
Agnew was born in Shipley, West Riding of Yorkshire. He started his career at Barnsley, staying there for eight years after turning professional and playing more than 200 times. He was sold to Blackburn Rovers for a £700,000 fee in June 1991 – making him the Ewood Park club's most costly signing at the time, just after wealthy owner Jack Walker bought the club. His spell at Blackburn was unsuccessful, only making four appearances before he joined Portsmouth on loan and then Leicester City permanently in the 1992–93 season, when Rovers were in the new Premier League and Leicester were challenging for promotion from Division One. During his time at Blackburn, the club earned promotion to the Premier League, but Agnew's part in the success was a minimal one as the attention was focused on big-money new signings such as Mike Newell and Roy Wegerle and later Alan Shearer and Stuart Ripley. One of Agnew's most memorable nights in a Leicester City shirt was 15 April 1993, when Leicester beat Millwall 3–0. Agnew scored and was sent off. Agnew "reacted angrily to a heavy challenge by Andy Roberts. At least a dozen players jostled each other as police, stewards and the respective managers tried to restore order. Agnew, who had already been cautioned, appeared to lash out at a Millwall player, leaving Mr Parker no option other than to reach for red. Millwall tried hard to exploit their numerical advantage, only for the home team to score again through David Oldfield." He was part of the Leicester team that won promotion to the Premier League as Division One play-off winners in 1994.

Agnew then moved north to Sunderland, helping them win promotion to the Premier League as Division One champions in 1996, although they went down after just one season. In 1998 he signed for York City and despite his efforts the Bootham Crescent team were unable to avoid relegation from Division Two in the 1998–99 season. Agnew spent the 2001–02 season playing for Gateshead, where he finished his playing career.

Coaching career
In February 2002, Agnew moved into coaching, becoming assistant manager of Gateshead to Gary Gill. Both he and Gill resigned from Gateshead after the playing budget was cut in early October 2002.

Agnew continued his coaching at the Middlesbrough Academy and then joined Leeds United as reserve-team manager on 23 July 2003. Agnew left the club to become assistant manager at Hartlepool United on 23 June 2005. On 9 February 2006, Agnew quit his position as reserve-team coach at Hartlepool before rejoining Leeds as under-18s manager.

He rejoined Middlesbrough as reserve-team coach on 23 January 2007. He was promoted to the position of assistant manager on 7 July 2008, following the departure of Steve Harrison. On 18 October 2010, he took over as caretaker manager at Middlesbrough following the resignation of Gordon Strachan. On 29 June 2012, Agnew took up the post of assistant manager at Hull City.

On 23 December 2014, Agnew joined Middlesbrough as assistant head coach, working under head coach Aitor Karanka. On 16 March 2017, Agnew took over as caretaker manager at Middlesbrough, after Aitor Karanka was dismissed. His first match in charge came three days later, as Middlesbrough were beaten 3–1 at home by Manchester United. He was unable to save Middlesbrough from relegation after they finished 19th in the Premier League, remaining in charge until the appointment of Garry Monk on 9 June 2017.

On 22 December 2017 Agnew was appointed the first team coach of Aston Villa. But on 3 October 2018, head coach Steve Bruce, Colin Calderwood, Stephen Clemence, Gary Walsh and Agnew himself, were all fired.

On 2 January 2019 Sheffield Wednesday announced that the club had appointed Steve Bruce as the club's new head coach from 1 February 2019. Clemence and Agnew would be in charge of the team in his absence until that date. With the arriving of Bruce, Agnew would function as a first team coach. In November 2021, Agnew followed Bruce out the door at Newcastle United, following the appointment of Eddie Howe and his backroom staff.

Bruce was appointed manager of Championship club West Bromwich Albion in February 2022, and was again accompanied by Agnew and Clemence. They left with him when he was sacked eight months later. on 30 of January 2023 he join  Aberdeen as interim assistant manager to interim manager Barry Robson following sacking of Jim Goodwin.

Personal life
Agnew's nephew Jordan Rhodes is also a footballer.

Managerial statistics

Honours
Sunderland
Football League First Division: 1995–96

References

External links

1965 births
Living people
Sportspeople from Shipley, West Yorkshire
English footballers
Association football midfielders
Barnsley F.C. players
Blackburn Rovers F.C. players
Portsmouth F.C. players
Leicester City F.C. players
Sunderland A.F.C. players
York City F.C. players
Gateshead F.C. players
English Football League players
Premier League players
Northern Premier League players
English football managers
Middlesbrough F.C. managers
English Football League managers
Premier League managers
Gateshead F.C. non-playing staff
Middlesbrough F.C. non-playing staff
Leeds United F.C. non-playing staff
Hartlepool United F.C. non-playing staff
Hull City A.F.C. non-playing staff
Aston Villa F.C. non-playing staff
Sheffield Wednesday F.C. non-playing staff
Newcastle United F.C. non-playing staff
West Bromwich Albion F.C. non-playing staff
Aberdeen F.C. non-playing staff